Barshong Toed is one of the five chiwogs  (a sub-county administrative unit) of Barshong Gewog under Tsirang District, Bhutan. It had 256 population as of 2008 and only one registered jurisdiction.

References 

Tsirang District